A prospective cost is a cost that may be incurred or changed if an action is taken: Whether or not the cost is paid depends on some action. Prospective costs can lead to unintended loss and positive or negative results for the stakeholders, and can be contrasted with sunk costs, which are costs that have already been incurred.

References

Costs